Europa Universalis is a board game created by Philippe Thibaut and released by Azure Wish Enterprise on 27 April 1993. It is a geopolitical strategy game in which players compete as the powers of Europe during the period 1492 to 1792. In 2000, Paradox Interactive released a computerized version, the first in a series of four games.

Description
This atypically long board game has an official playing time of 6 hours according to the game box, but games can last for weeks; Board Game Geek estimates the playing time to be 15 days. About 1,000 markers are used, as well as two  maps: one for Europe and one for the rest of the world. The English rulebook is 72 pages long.

Gameplay
The players have extraordinary freedom of choice regarding economics, military, maintenance, discoveries, and colonial investment. One drawback is that there is a lot of calculation and management required during the game regarding computing income, price changes, maintenance and purchases of military resources.

Extensions and variants
A first official extension was released and introduced new rules for forts and missionaries, as well as a new set of objectives. A second extension has been widely circulated on the internet. It introduced yet another set of rules, such as palaces, including historical monarchs with predefined characteristics and a faster combat system that could divide by ten or more the time for one battle, as well as many new minor countries and counters. It was never published officially.

Two more variants have also been circulated: the event rewrite by Risto Marjomaa and the Europa8 version by Pierre Borgnat, Bertrand Asseray, Jean-Yves Moyen and Jean-Christophe Dubacq, which introduces two more players, revised counters and maps, and is not finished yet. Both of these can be obtained for free either by download or by asking the authors. There is also a mailing-list which is quite responsive in suggestions and advice about the rules.

References

External links
Azure Wish Enterprise

Board games introduced in 1993
Board games about history